Greg Calloway is an American entrepreneur, artist and filmmaker from the Washington, D.C. area.  In 2006, he won the AOL and Warner Music Group online reality show, The Biz.

The Biz was the music business version of Donald Trump's television program The Apprentice. On The Biz, Warner Music Group Chairman and CEO of US Recorded Music, Lyor Cohen, called the shots. The Biz featured nine contestants vying for the top job and facing real-life music industry challenges under the watchful eye of Mr. Cohen, to find out what it takes to be the next music mogul. Along the way they worked with artists such as Fall Out Boy, Panic! at the Disco, and Jason Mraz. They were advised by industry heavyweights such as Ahmet Ertegun, Jac Holzman, Kevin Liles, and Todd Moscowitz as they climbed the corporate ladder from intern to manager, director, Vice President and ultimately President.

After The Biz, Calloway founded a new venture called "Defient Entertainment".  In 2012, Greg Calloway moved to Atlanta and relaunched Defient with B.o.B's manager, Brian "B Rich" Richardson and Doug Peterson from T.I's Grand Hustle records.

Videography as director

Music videos
Zuse
Red (2014)
Doe B
2 Many ft. Rich Homie Quan (2013)
Kevin Gates
Amnesia ft Doe B (2013)
Wish I Had It (behind the scenes) (2014)
Young Dro
Grits (2014)
Swoop (viral) (2013)
B.o.B
Through My Head (viral) (2013)
Greedy Love (lyric video) (2013)
Ready ft. Future (viral) (2013)
Headband ft 2 Chainz (lyric video) (2013)
Label No Genre
Tour Bus ft. Jaque Beatz, Jake Lambo, B.o.B (Live) (2015)
Fleek ft. B.o.B, Lin-Z, Jaque Beats (2014)

Videography as producer

Music videos
B.o.B
Strange Clouds Remix (2012)
Ray Bands (2012)
We Still In This B (2013)
Lambo Music ft. Jake Lambo and Kevin Gates (2014)
Forget (2014)
The Nation ft. Jake Lambo (2014)
Follow Me Now (2014)
Get Right ft. Mike Fresh (2014)
Mission Stagement (2014)
Many Rivers (2014)
Doe B
Real Niggas ft. Shad Da God, Yung Booke, Big Kuntry King (2013)
Paid The Plug (2013)
Homicide ft. T.I. (2014)
Neva Had Shit (2014)
Young Dro
FDB (2013)
Be Like That Sometimes ft Doe B (2013)
Poppin 4 Sum ft B.o.B and Yung Booke (2013)
Strong ft. 2 Chainz (2013)
Hammer Time ft. Spodee (2014)

References

Living people
Year of birth missing (living people)
American music video producers